Joanne Leung Wing-yan is the first openly transgender politician in Hong Kong.

Assigned male at birth, she underwent sex-reassignment surgery in 2009 to become legally recognized as a woman. She was the chairperson of Pink Alliance until 2017 and is the founder and chairperson of Transgender Resource Center (TGR), two active non-governmental organizations that aim to service the LGBT community and promote LGBT equality. Leung is a transgender lesbian.

Biography 
Leung has stated that she first knew she should physically be a girl at the age of six. As a child, she didn't know how to deal with bullies and kept her feelings to herself. Hiding her transgender identity led to four attempted suicides. In 2004, she consulted a sex clinic to find about sex reassignment surgery. In 2009, she finally underwent the operation.

After surgery, she started to think about supporting the transgender community. Leung's stated goal is for Hong Kong society to learn more about transsexual and transgender individuals. Leung has been fighting hard for LGBT rights in Hong Kong. She wants to ensure that other transgender people do not have to go through what she endured, especially since there is only little information on being transgender available to them. Thus, she helped set up the Transgender Resource Centre (TGR) which helps support transgender individuals and provides education about transgender issues. Leung works with TGR on a full-time basis.

In 2014, Leung received her degree in computing from the University of Greenwich. Also in 2014, she spoke to the United Nations Committee on the Elimination of Discrimination against Women (CEDAW), and was the first transgender person from Hong Kong to do so. She was also openly vocal in her opposition to an amendment to the Marriage Ordinance which would require transgender individuals to have sex reassignment surgery before they could marry. Leung has also been a member of the Advisory Group on Eliminating Discrimination against Sexual Minorities, a group convened by the Hong Kong Special Administrative Region government, and the Community Forum on AIDS. In 2015, Leung joined the Democratic Party in Hong Kong to modernize the party's stance on LGBT issues. She ran in the party primaries of 2016 Hong Kong Legislative election, but was defeated by Lam Cheuk-ting, who subsequently won in the general election. She has been the Policy Committee (LGBT) for The Professional Commons since Nov 2018.

Leung has stepped down as the chairperson of the Transgender Resource Center she founded on 17 May 2019 during the IDAHOT event in Hong Kong. Henry Tse was the new chairman and Leung is still keeping her role as vice-chair mainly for tasks of supporting and Transgender HIV project. Henry resigned in Oct 2020 and Leung step up again remotely in Taiwan while continuing her master's degree in gender studies and focus more on research work, cooperate with other groups, and to support new formed transgender groups in both Hong Kong and mainland China.

Awards 

 2021 – Selected as one of the "Women of Power 2021" by Prestige Hong Kong Magazine
2018 – Prism Award by Hong Kong Lesbian & Gay Film Festival
 2017 – Nominee for the Secretary's International Women of Courage Award, honoring women who have demonstrated exceptional courage, strength, and leadership in acting to improve others' lives
2017 – Woman of Courage Award by the U.S. Consulate Hong Kong and Macau
 2017 – Listed as one of the 18 Everyday Heros in Mingpao Weekly
 2016 – Annual LGBT Milestone Award (ALMA)
 2014 – "She Dare to Change" Award by HER Fund
 2012 – Selected as one of the "45 People Aged 45 or Below Making a Difference in Hong Kong" by Baccarat Magazine in 2012

Publication 
Published by Transgender Resource Center
 2012 – Gossip Boys and Girls Book 1 – Domestic Transgender Reading Manual
 2015 – Gossip Boys and Girls Book 2 – A Handbook for Parents of Trans People
 2016 – Gossip Boys and Girls Book 3 – A Handbook for Trans Ally
 2017 – Gossip Boys & Girls Book 4：The Book of Transgender in Hong Kong
2019 – Gossip Boys & Girls Book 5：TranStory Chinese version (Editing)
2019 – Gossip Boys & Girls Book 5：TranStory English version (Editing and Translation)

References

External links 
 I Am Who I Am (video in Chinese with English subtitles)

Year of birth missing (living people)
Transgender women
Hong Kong LGBT politicians
Hong Kong LGBT rights activists
Hong Kong transgender people
Living people
Democratic Party (Hong Kong) politicians
Hong Kong Christians